In English, many vowel shifts affect only vowels followed by  in rhotic dialects, or vowels that were historically followed by  that has been elided in non-rhotic dialects. Most of them involve the merging of vowel distinctions and so fewer vowel phonemes occur before  than in other positions of a word.

Overview 

In rhotic dialects,  is pronounced in most cases. In Scottish English,  is traditionally pronounced as a flap  or trill , and there are no r-colored vowels.

In non-rhotic dialects like Received Pronunciation (RP), historic  is elided at the end of a syllable, and if the preceding vowel is stressed, it undergoes compensatory lengthening or breaking (diphthongization). Thus, words that historically had  often have long vowels or centering diphthongs ending in a schwa , or a diphthong followed by a schwa.
 earth: GA , RP 
 here: GA , RP 
 fire: GA , RP 

Vowel shifts before historical  fall into two categories: mergers and splits. Mergers are more common and so most English dialects have fewer vowel distinctions before historical  than in other positions of a word.

In many North American dialects, there are ten or eleven stressed monophthongs; only five or six vowel (rarely seven) contrasts are possible before a preconsonantal and word-final  (beer, bear, burr, bar, bore, bor, boor). Often, more contrasts exist if  appears between vowels of different syllables. In some American dialects and in most native English dialects outside North America, for example, mirror and nearer do not rhyme, and some or all of marry, merry, and Mary are pronounced distinctly. (In North America, those distinctions are most likely to occur in New York City, Philadelphia, some of Eastern New England (including Boston), and in conservative Southern accents.) In many dialects, however, the number of contrasts in that position tends to be reduced, and the tendency seems to be towards further reduction. The difference in how the reductions have been manifested represents one of the greatest sources of cross-dialect variation.

Non-rhotic accents in many cases show mergers in the same positions as rhotic accents even though there is often no  phoneme present.

The phenomenon that occurs in many dialects of the United States is one of tense–lax neutralization in which the normal English distinction between tense and lax vowels is eliminated.

In some cases, the quality of a vowel before  is different from the quality of the vowel elsewhere. For example, in some dialects of American English, the quality of the vowel in more typically does not occur except before , and it is somewhere in between the vowels of maw and mow. It is similar to the vowel of the latter word but without the glide.

It is important to note, however, that different mergers occur in different dialects. Among United States accents, the Boston, Eastern New England and New York accents have the lowest degree of pre-rhotic merging. Some have observed that rhotic North American accents are more likely to have such merging than non-rhotic accents, but that cannot be said of rhotic British accents like Scottish English, which is firmly rhotic but has many varieties with the same vowel contrasts before  as before any other consonant.

Mergers before intervocalic R 
Most North American English dialects merge the lax vowels with the tense vowels before  and so "marry" and "merry" have the same vowel as "mare," "mirror" has the same vowel as "mere," "forest" has the same vowel as the stressed form of "for," and "hurry" has the same vowel as "stir" as well as that found in the second syllable of "letter". The mergers are typically resisted by non-rhotic North Americans and are largely absent in areas of the United States that are historically largely nonrhotic.

Hurry–furry merger 

That is particularly a feature in many dialects of North American English but not New York City English, Mid-Atlantic American English, older Southern American English, some speakers of Eastern New England English, and speakers of Southeastern New England English. Speakers with the merger pronounce hurry to rhyme with furry and turret to rhyme with stir it. To occur, the merger requires the nurse mergers to be in full effect, which is the case outside the British Isles. In Scotland, hurry  is a perfect rhyme of furry , but there is no merger since the vowel  has never developed because of the lack of nurse mergers. That means that ,  and  can all occur before both intervocalic and coda  and so fur, fern, and fir have distinct vowels: .

Dialects in England, Wales, and most others outside North America maintain the distinction between both sounds and so hurry and furry do not rhyme. However, in dialects without the foot-strut split, hurry has an entirely different vowel:  (in a number of those dialects, a square-nurse merger is in effect instead).

General American has a three-way merger between the first vowels in hurry and furry and the unstressed vowel in letters. See the strut–comma merger for more information.

Mary–marry–merry merger

The merger is fairly widespread and is complete or nearly complete in most varieties of North American English, but it is rare in other varieties of English. The following variants are common in North America:
 The full Mary–marry–merry merger (also known, in this context, as the three-way merger) is found throughout much of the United States (particularly the Western and Central United States) and in all of Canada except Montreal. This is found in about 57% of American English speakers, according to a 2003 dialect survey.
 No merger, also known as a three-way contrast, exists in North America primarily in the Northeastern United States and is most clearly documented in the accents of Philadelphia, New York City, and Rhode Island; 17% of Americans have no merger. In the Philadelphia accent, the three-way contrast is preserved, but merry tends to be merged with Murray, and ferry can likewise be a homophone of furry (see merry–Murray merger below). The three-way contrast is found in about 17% of American English speakers overall.
 The Mary–marry merger is found alone, with 16% of American English speakers overall, particularly in the Northeast.
 The Mary–merry merger is found alone among Anglophones in Montreal and in the American South, with 9% of American English speakers overall, particularly in the East.
 The merry–marry merger is found alone rarely, with about 1% of American English speakers.

In accents without the merger, Mary has the a sound of mare, marry has the "short a" sound of mat, and merry has the "short e" sound of met. There is plenty of variance in the distribution of the merger, with expatriate communities of those speakers being formed all over the country.

In all of those cases, there is a clear distinction between Mary and merry (regardless of how both are pronounced) and marry  (with the  vowel) on the other.

Merry–Murray merger 
That is common in the Philadelphia accent, which does not usually have the marry–merry merger, but its "short a" , as in marry, is a distinct unmerged class before . Therefore, merry and Murray are pronounced the same, but marry is pronounced differently.

Mirror–nearer and  mergers 
In the case of the  merger, it tends to approach the monophthongal variant of : .

In the case of the first merger, only a handful of minimal pairs (e.g. cirrus–serous and Sirius–serious) illustrate the contrast, in addition to morphologically distinct pairs (e.g.spirit–spear it), all of which are rendered homophonous by the merger. Indeed, the amount of the words containing  is itself low. Instead, it is a simple replacement of one phoneme with another, so that the word tour  is perceived to contain the  vowel, rather than the  vowel. However, this change may not hold where morpheme boundaries apply, allowing a qualitative distinction to be maintained between the stressed vowels in tourist  (a fairly close back monophthong of variable height) on the one hand and two-wrist  (a fully close monophthong in free variation with a narrow closing diphthong) on the other hand (cf. traditional RP ). The same applies to the mirror–nearer merger, which laxes the vowel in clearing  but not in key ring , cf. RP . Certain words are pronounced as if they contained a morpheme boundary before , notably hero  and zero .

Some words originally containing the  sequence are merged with either  (see cure–force merger) or, more rarely,  (see cure–nurse merger) instead of  + .

Words with a stressed  before intervocalic  in Received Pronunciation are treated differently in different varieties of North American English.

In that regard, it is the same as Canadian , rather than Received Pronunciation . Most of the rest of the United States (marked "General American" in the table), however, has a distinctive mixed system.

In accents with the horse–hoarse merger,  also includes the historic  in words such as glory and force. Therefore, both cord and glory are considered to contain the  phoneme in California, Canada, and elsewhere.

Even in the American East Coast without the split (Boston, New York City, Rhode Island, Philadelphia and some of the coastal South), some of the words in the original short-o class often show influence from other American dialects and end up with  anyway. The list of words affected differs from dialect to dialect and occasionally from speaker to speaker, which is an example of sound change by lexical diffusion.

Mergers before historic postvocalic R

/aʊr/–/aʊər/ merger 
The Middle English merger of the vowels with the spellings  and  affects all modern varieties of English and causes words like sour and hour, which originally had one syllable, to have two syllables and so to rhyme with power. In accents that lack the merger, sour has one syllable, and power has two syllables. Similar mergers also occur in which hire gains a syllable and so makes it pronounced like higher, and coir gains a syllable and so makes it pronounced like coyer.

Card–cord merger 
It is roughly similar to the father–bother merger but before r. The merger is found in some Caribbean English accents, in some West Country accents in England, and in some accents of Southern American English. Areas of the United States in which the merger is most common include Central Texas, Utah, and St. Louis, but it is not dominant even there and is rapidly disappearing. In the United States, dialects with the card–cord merger are some of the only ones without the horse–hoarse merger, and there is a well-documented correlation between them.

merger 
Words belonging to that class are most commonly spelled with oor, our, ure, or eur. Examples include poor, tour, cure, Europe (words such as moor ultimately from Old English ō words). Wells refers to the class as the  words after the keyword of the lexical set to which he assigns them.

In traditional Received Pronunciation and General American,  words are pronounced with Received Pronunciation  ( before a vowel) and General American . However, those pronunciations are being replaced by other pronunciations in many accents.

The traditional form is much more common in Northern England.

The outcome that occurs in a particular word is not always predictable although, for example, pure, cure, and tour rhyme with fewer and have , and poor, moor, and sure rhyme with for and paw and have .

merger 
In East Anglia, a  merger in which words like fury merge to the sound of furry  is common, especially after palatal and palatoalveolar consonants and so sure is often pronounced , which is also a common single-word merger in American English in which the word sure is often . Other pronunciations in the accents that merge cure and fir include  pure,  curious,  bureau and  mural.

– merger 
Varieties of Southern American English, Midland American English and High Tider English may merge words like fire and far or tired  and tarred towards of the second words: . That results in a tire–tar merger, but tower is kept distinct.

–– merger 
Some speakers merge all three sounds and so tower, tire, and tar are all pronounced .

Horse–hoarse merger 

The horse–hoarse merger, or  merger, is the merger of the vowels  and  before historic , which makes word pairs like horse–hoarse, for–four, war–wore, or–oar, morning–mourning pronounced the same.

The merger now occurs in most varieties of English, but the phonemes were historically separate. Accents that have resisted the merger include most Scottish, Caribbean, and older Southern American accents as well as some African American, modern Southern American, Indian, Irish, and older Maine accents. Therefore, hoarse  is pronounced longer than horse .

In his 1918 Outline of English Phonetics, Daniel Jones describes the distinction as optional, but he still considers it to be frequently heard in 1962; the two vowels are differentiated in the first (1884–1928) and second (1989) editions of the Oxford English Dictionary with the caveat that in most varieties of southern British pronunciation the two have become identical; no distinction is drawn in the third edition, as well as in most modern British dictionaries (Chambers being a notable exception). According to John C. Wells, the distinction is by now obsolete in RP.

However, the change did not affect all derived forms, such as warrior .

In Scottish English, which merges cot with caught, moral, war, and warring belong to the  class (– + ):  (as does warrior ), but oral, bore and boring feature  (which is  + ): . The same applies to the conservative General American varieties that preserve the – distinction.

Some regional non-rhotic British English retains the – distinction (with  being distinct from  + prevocalic , as in Received Pronunciation), as is the case in, for example, South Wales (excluding Cardiff) and some West Midlands English.

The areas of Wales that make the distinction merge it with the monophthongal variety of :  (those accents lack the toe–tow merger), but in the West Midlands, it corresponds to  + :  or a separate  phoneme: . The words belonging to each set vary to an extent region to region, and speakers from Port Talbot tend to use , instead of the etymologically correct , in forceps, fortress, important and importance.

In the United States, the merger is widespread everywhere but is quite recent in some parts of the country. For example, fieldwork performed in the 1930s by Kurath and McDavid shows the contrast to be robustly present in the speech of Vermont, northern and western New York State, Virginia, central and southern West Virginia, and North Carolina as well as the whole Atlantic coast (North and South). However, by the 1990s, telephone surveys conducted by Labov, Ash, and Boberg (2006) show those areas as having completely or almost completely undergone the merger. In the 2006 study, most white participants in only these American cities still resisted the merger: Wilmington, North Carolina; Mobile, Alabama; and Portland, Maine. A 2013 study of Portland, however, found the merger to have been established "at all age levels". In the 2006 study, even St. Louis, Missouri, which traditionally maintained the horse–hoarse distinction so strongly that it instead merged card and cord, showed that only 50% of the participants still maintained the distinction. The same pattern (a horse–hoarse distinction and a card–cord merger) also exists in a minority of speakers in Texas and Utah. New Orleans prominently shows much variability regarding the merger, including some speakers with no merger at all. Black Americans are rapidly undergoing the merger but are also less likely to do so than white Americans, with a little over half of the 2006 study's black participants maintaining the merger nationwide.

Words with the FORCE vowel that are not written with an obviously long vowel are relatively more likely to occur in the following circumstances:
 When the vowel immediately follows a labial consonant, as force itself. 
 In past participles in -orn whose corresponding past tense forms are in -ore, as in torn.
 in vowels ending with a silent e, as in horde.
 derived from a word where the long vowel spelling is used

merger 
Many speakers in New Zealand merge them towards the  vowel, but some speakers in East Anglia and South Carolina merge them towards the  vowel. The merger is widespread in Caribbean English, including Jamaican English.

mergers 

John C. Wells calls it briefly the  merger. The three separate vowels are retained by some speakers of Scottish English. What has been called the term–nurse merger is resisted by some speakers of Irish English, but the full merger is found in almost all other dialects of English.

For example, the words earn and urn are pronounced differently in those traditional varieties: as   vowel after a labial consonant, as in fern; when it is spelled as "ur" or "or", as in word; or when it is spelled as "ir" after an alveolar stop, as in dirt. Examples with  include certain , chirp , circle , earn , earth , girl , germ , heard or herd , irk , and tern . Examples for  include bird , dirt , first , murder , nurse , turn , third or turd , urn , work , and world .

In Scottish English, a distinct nurse or fur vowel is also used in these cases:
The surviving  (barring the hurry–furry merger) can be compared to words like .
In Scottish English, a distinct term or fern vowel is used in these cases:
 (past tense of to be)

merger 
However,  is dropped after a consonant cluster (as in queer) or a palato-alveolar consonant (as in cheer), likely because of phonotactic constraints, which then results in a merger with : , .

merger 

Some  words (roughly those spelled with a) have a distinct  vowel in broad Geordie. Therefore, the merger involves only some of the words corresponding to historical  in Received Pronunciation.

merger 

Shorrocks reports that in the dialect of Bolton, Greater Manchester, the two sets are generally merged to /ɵ:/, but some  words such as first have a short /ɵ/.

The merger is found in some varieties of African American Vernacular English and is pronounced : "A recent development reported for some AAE (in Memphis, but likely found elsewhere)." This is exemplified in Chingy's song "Right Thurr", in which the merger is spelled in the title.

Labov (1994) also reports such a merger in some western parts of the United States "with a high degree of r constriction."

See also 
 Phonological history of English
 Phonological history of English vowels
 Coil–curl merger
 English phonology
 History of English
 R-colored vowel

Sound samples

References

Sources

 
 
 
 
 
 
 
 
 
 
 

Dialects of English
Splits and mergers in English phonology